Akitsu Station can refer to two different train stations in Japan:
, on the Seibu Ikebukuro Line located in Higashimurayama, Tokyo, Japan
, on the Kure Line located in Higashihiroshima, Hiroshima, Japan